The Almighty Gaylords Nation is a Chicago street gang that was most active during the mid and late 20th century. It originated on the intersection of Grand Avenue and Noble Street in Chicago's West Town neighborhood. The original president of the Gaylords selected the name after reading about the Gaylords in the public library (the Gaillards, later anglicized to Gaylord, were people from Normandy who lived near the Château Gaillard, constructed by Richard I). They are part of the People Nation alliance. They are reputed for disputing rival gangs near Kilbourn Park.

Origins and history
The Almighty Gaylords Nation is one of Chicago's oldest street gangs and was founded in the West Town neighborhood of Chicago in 1953. The majority of the original members were Italian, but they did take in some non-Italians, including some Mexican Americans. This ethnic makeup reflected the population of the Neighborhood at the time, and was known as one of Chicago's "Little Italies". The first street corners they claimed were Huron and Throop, where they hung out at Angie's, followed by Grand and Ogden, and finally Ohio and Noble. The Gaylords would soon take control of about half of the West Town area and all of Noble Square. They had their own clubhouses and baseball teams. The main clubhouse for the Gaylords by the late 1950s was on the corner of Ohio and Noble Street. Some of their earliest rivals were C-Notes, Lazy Gents, and Playboys. Some original Ohio & Noble Gaylords included Anthony Johnny Boy Anarina and Bobby Shipbaugh. It should also be noted that there were other clubs in Chicago with the name Gaylords, that had no connection to the Gaylords of West Town/ Noble Square, like the Little Village Gaylords that started in 1950 - 1951 and lasted until the Vietnam war, when most of their members enlisted and the Gaylords club within the Taylor Street area, which started at some point prior to 1954.

The Gaylords grew in the 1960s, opening up territory in the Pilsen neighborhood; at 18th & Western, and more notoriously in Logan Square, at Lawndale, Altgeld, and in Kilbourn Park. More turf for the Gaylords opened up across the north side, as middle-class Whites left for the suburbs, leaving poor Whites behind to fend for themselves in increasingly Puerto Rican, Mexican, and African American city slums.  At the height of the Gaylords reign in 1979, they were listed as the fourth most powerful gang in Chicago with about 1,500 members and were noted as "Chicago's largest White street gang...considered a violent, bigoted outfit." In 1970, they were suspected for being involved in the murder of a black Chicago citizen named Joe Henson, but no charges were brought: a later feature article in the Chicago Reader alleged police and political coverup. It must also be noted that the Uptown Rebels were suspected of the murder and were more likely the real perpetrators of the crime.

During their peak period, the Chicago Gaylords held sets (or sections) on the North Side, West side, and the South Side of Chicago. By the early 1980s, it was said the Gaylords were the third largest gang in Chicago with 6,000 members. The West side sections included Ohio and Noble, Ohio and Leclaire and Monticelllo and Augusta. Their South Side sections included Back of the Yards and West Englewood (around 55th & Ashland, Sherman Park), Pilsen (18th & Western), and Bridgeport (Throop Street). Their North Side presence included Belmont Cragin, Manor Bowl, Reinberg School, Chopin Park, Blackhawk Park, St Gens., Humboldt Park (Moffat & Campbell); Logan Square (Palmer & California, Lawndale & Altgeld); Irving Park (Albany & Byron); Kilbourn Park (Roscoe & Kilbourn); Kelvyn Park (Kilbourn & Wrightwood); Dunham Park (Montrose & Narragansett); Ravenswood (Seeley & Ainslie); and Uptown (Sunnyside & Magnolia, Lawrence & Broadway). Two of the most powerful Gaylord sections existed in Logan Square: Lawndale and Altgeld (L-A section) and Palmer and California (Palmer Street).

By the early 1990s, the Gaylords were in decline, as many of their leaders went to prison and the last of Whites were leaving the inner city for the suburbs. In 2011, police and federal agents arrested 9 members of suburban Gaylord's factions on charges of drug dealing, gun trafficking, and violent intimidation. However, they continue to remain active within their strongholds in Chicago and its environs to this day.

Gang structure

Gang colors 
The sets, or sections, started by Kilbourn Park wore black and light blue. Sections started by Palmer street wore black and gray. South Side sections started by the 18th and Western section like 55th and Ashland and Sherman Park wore black and brown.

References

External links
Gaylords Official Website Chicago Gaylords, Chicago Street Gangs, Chicago Gang Information. 'Gaylords history from Post World War II until 1998'

Organizations established in the 1940s
1940s establishments in Illinois
People Nation
European-American gangs
European-American culture in Chicago
Gangs in Chicago